Terminal Error is a 2002 science fiction thriller directed by John Murlowski and starring Michael Nouri, Marina Sirtis, Matthew Ewald and Timothy Busfield.

Plot
Elliot, a vengeful ex-employee of a computer firm wants revenge and befriends the boss Brad's son Dylan giving him an MP3 file containing a computer virus. This virus creates havoc all across the city by poisoning the water with chlorine, making planes crash and ultimately developing an intelligence of its own. The virus is eventually traced to a server and is terminated by another equally powerful virus created by Brad and Dylan with a Game Boy Color.

Cast
 Michael Nouri as Brad Weston
 Marina Sirtis as Alex
 Matthew Ewald as Dylan
 David Wells as Russ
 Timothy Busfield as Elliot Nescher
 Audrey Wasilewski as Kathy
 Robert Covarrubias as Kenny
 Rick Cramer as Detective
 David Storrs as Recruit
 Kim Delgado as Franklin
 Jane Yamamoto as Miriam
 Robert Leon Casey as Pilot
 Scott Clifton as Jock

References

External links
 

2002 films
2000s science fiction thriller films
American science fiction thriller films
British science fiction thriller films
Films directed by John Murlowski
2000s English-language films
2000s American films
2000s British films